Malakand may refer to:

Places in Pakistan
Malakand Agency, a tribal area in the North West Frontier Province before 1970
Malakand District, a district in Khyber Pakhtunkhwa, also known as Malakand Protected Area
Malakand (union council), an administrative unit in Malakand District
Malakand Division, an administrative division between 1970 and 2000
Malakand Fort, a fort in Khyber Pakhtunwala
Malakand Pass, a mountain pass, the location of Malakand Fort
University of Malakand, a public university in Chakdara, Pakistan

Other uses
 SS Malakand, the name of two ships

See also 
 Siege of Malakand
 Malakand Levies